Sándor Pintér (born 18 July 1950) is a Hungarian football midfielder who played for Hungary in the 1978 FIFA World Cup. He also played for Budapest Honvéd FC.

References

External links
 

1950 births
Hungarian footballers
Hungary international footballers
Association football midfielders
Budapest Honvéd FC players
1978 FIFA World Cup players
Living people
People from Pomáz
Sportspeople from Pest County